The Women's Australian Open 2011 is the women' edition of the 2011 Australian Open, which is a tournament of the WSA World Series event Gold (Prize money : 74 000 $). The event took place in Canberra in Australia from 9 to 14 August. Nicol David won her first Australian Open trophy, beating Jenny Duncalf in the final.

Prize money and ranking points
For 2011, the prize purse was $74,000. The prize money and points breakdown is as follows:

Seeds

Draw and results

See also
WSA World Tour 2011
Australian Open (squash)
2011 Men's Australian Open (squash)

References

External links
WSA Australian Open 2011 website
Australian Open official website

Squash tournaments in Australia
squash
2011 in women's squash